Shottas is a 2002 Jamaican crime film about two young men who participate in organized crime in Kingston and Miami. It stars Ky-Mani Marley, Spragga Benz, Paul Campbell and Louie Rankin and was written and directed by Cess Silvera. Despite its low budget, the distribution of an unfinished bootleg made it a cult favourite long before its official limited release in the United States by Triumph Films and Destination Films in 2006.

Plot
Biggs (Errol) (Ky-Mani Marley) and Wayne (Spragga Benz), are two young men who grow up together in the tough and dangerous streets of Kingston. They rob a soda truck and shoot the truck driver while they are still children.

The robbery money is used to purchase visas to go the United States, where they continue their criminal activities, hustling on the streets of Miami. Twenty years later, Biggs is deported to Jamaica where Wayne and Mad Max (Paul Campbell), also deported, have continued their surge in crime by extorting money from businessmen. After facing problems with the police and politicians, the two head back to Miami alongside Mad Max. Upon returning, they are informed that Miami has a new drug kingpin, Teddy Bruck Shut (Louie Rankin).

The three pay Teddy a visit to extort him. They extort, beat, and murder their way to the top of the Miami underworld. Their dream ends in a brazen shoot out, during which Teddy's thugs kill Wayne and shoot Max. Biggs is nearly killed as he comforts Wayne at his deathbed, but Max shoots the assailant before it happens.

After taking Max to the hospital, Biggs goes to Teddy's house and murders him, his bodyguard and his girlfriend. Biggs then takes all the money and gets on a boat, presumably to Los Angeles, as he mentioned purchasing a house there prior to the massive firefight.

Cast

 Ky-Mani Marley as Errol "Biggs" Williams
 Corey Agnant as "Richie's Son"
 Judith Bodley as "Mr. Chin's Secretary"
 Spragga Benz as "Wayne"
 Paul Campbell as "Mad Max"
 Stephen Cheong as "Mr. Chin"
 Flippa Mafia as "John John"
 Assassin as "Blacka"
 Fabienne Dominique as "Abbey"
 Michael Gordon as "Soda Truck Driver"
 Carlton Grant Jr. as "Young Wayne"
 Leighton Hilton as "Airport Cop #2"
 Wyclef Jean as "Richie Effs"
 DJ Khaled as "Richie's henchman"
 Papa Keith as "Carjack Victim"
 Desmond Kingas "Big Man"
 Isiah Laing as "Detective Laing"
 Marilyn Manhoe as "Marcia"
 Jabba Mitchell as "Dangles"
 Claudette Pious as "Auntie Pauline"
 Louie Rankin as "Teddy Bruck Shut"
 Prince Reed as "Jitney Driver"
 Dwight Richardson as "Immigration Inspector"
 Macka Diamond
 Patrick Scott as "Sando"
 J.R. Silvera as "young Biggs".
 Jennifer Small as "Mr. Anderson's Secretary"
 Jahshi Spence as "Rasta Neville"
 Prince Thompson as "Ol' School"
 Rohan Wade as "Airport Cop #1"
 Munair Zacca as "Mr. Anderson"
 Nelson Zapata as "Papi"
 San San as "Raquel"
 Screechie Bop as "Gussy"

Soundtrack 
Damian Marley - Welcome to Jamrock
Barry Brown - Far East
Nitty Gritty - Trial and Crosses
Little John - In the Ghetto
Bob Marley - Coming in From the Cold
Bounty Killer - Dead This Time
Hawkeye - Bad Long Time
Spragga Benz & Lady Saw - Backshot
Damian Marley - Catch a Fire
Shaggy and the Big Yard Allstars - Gangster
Tonto Irie - It a Ring
Ky-Mani Marley - Fire
Junior Cat  - Would A Let You Go
Pinchers - Bandelero
John Wayne - Call the Police
Nicky Seizure - Quench the Fire
Ky-Mani Marley - I Believe
Ky-Enie - Rain
Inner Circle - Discipline Child (Live)
Nicky Seizure - Revelation time
Ky-Mani Marley - The March
Kenneth Milligan - Shottas
Pan Head - Gun Man Tune
Big Yard - Gangsters

See also 
 List of hood films

References

External links 
 
 
 

2000s crime films
2002 films
Films about drugs
Films set in 1978
Films set in 1998
Films set in Jamaica
Jamaican drama films
Gangster films
Films set in Miami
MoviePass Films films
Jamaican films about cannabis
2000s buddy films
2000s American films